Mount Vernon Square is a Washington Metro station in Washington, D.C., on the Green and Yellow Lines.

Location
Mount Vernon Square station is located at the border of the neighborhoods of Downtown and Shaw in the northwestern quadrant of Washington. Its namesake, Mount Vernon Square, is located two blocks to the south at the convergence of New York Avenue and Massachusetts Avenues and 7th, 9th, and K Streets. The station's subtitle is derived from the station's location along 7th Street NW, and its close proximity to the Walter E. Washington Convention Center, although the station is only one of five Metro stations that run underneath 7th Street NW.

Transit-oriented development
Like many other Metro stations in the Washington Metropolitan Area, Mount Vernon Square station has spurred development in its proximity. Most prominent is the Washington Convention Center, although a number of smaller residential and commercial projects have been completed within the surrounding blocks. To the southeast of the station is the Mount Vernon Triangle, a business improvement district (BID) seeing rapid mixed-use growth. To the southwest of the station is the mixed-use CityCenterDC development project, which is home to luxury condominiums and luxury retail franchises such as Louis Vuitton, Moncler, Gucci, Hugo Boss, Tesla, Del Frisco's Double Eagle Steak House, Fig & Olive and other upscale dining and shopping destinations.

History
Service began on May 11, 1991. The station mezzanine was renovated in 2003 to coincide with the opening of the Walter E. Washington Convention Center. The renovation included additional faregates and a new street entrance.

In 2003, two redundant elevators near the entrance with escalators were opened and the station is the first station to get redundant elevators.

On January 7, 2007, the fifth car of a six-car train derailed in the tunnel at the interlocking south of the station, sending twenty people to the hospital for minor injuries and significantly damaging a rail car. Service resumed the next day at 5 AM.

As of May 25, 2019, Yellow Line trains no longer terminate at this station during rush hours and extend to Greenbelt at all times.

From March 26, 2020 until June 28, 2020, this station was closed due to the 2020 coronavirus pandemic.

From October 12th, 2021 to October 14th, 2021 Blue Line Trains temporarily served this station due to a derailment near the Arlington Cemetery Station.

Name changes
Originally to be named "Federal City College", the station was named Mount Vernon Square–UDC at the time of its 1991 opening, reflecting the establishment of the University of the District of Columbia. The station was renamed Mt Vernon Sq/7th Street–Convention Center in 2001; the "7th Street" helped distinguish that the stop served the new Walter E. Washington Convention Center as opposed to the old Washington Convention Center at 9th Street NW. On November 3, 2011, the station was again renamed, taking "Mount Vernon Square" as the main name, with "7th Street–Convention Center" as a subtitle.

Station layout
The station has a single island platform accessed from the southwest corner of Seventh and M Streets, NW.

References

External links

 The Schumin Web Transit Center: Mt. Vernon Square Station
 M Street entrance from Google Maps Street View

Stations on the Green Line (Washington Metro)
Mount Vernon Square
Washington Metro stations in Washington, D.C.
Stations on the Yellow Line (Washington Metro)
Railway stations in the United States opened in 1991
1991 establishments in Washington, D.C.
Railway stations located underground in Washington, D.C.
Shaw (Washington, D.C.)